The Holy Innocents (1981) is a novel by Miguel Delibes about the everyday life on a farm in Extremadura during the Franco dictatorship.

Adaptation
A Spanish film adaptation of the novel was made in 1984, directed by Mario Camus.

References

1981 novels
Spanish novels adapted into films